WMER (1390 AM) is a Gospel radio station broadcasting in the Meridian, Mississippi, Arbitron market.

Translator
WMER is also heard on 93.1 FM, through a translator in Meridian, Mississippi.

References

External links
WMER's website

MER
Gospel radio stations in the United States